Kamratvallen  is a football stadium in Holmsund, Sweden and the home stadium for the football team IFK Holmsund.

References 

Football venues in Sweden